Clara.io is web-based freemium 3D computer graphics software developed by Exocortex, a Canadian software company. The free or "Basic" component of their freemium offering, however, places severe restrictions, such as on saving models and importing texture maps, which are undisclosed in the company's own descriptions of their plans.  Clara.io was announced in July 2013 and first presented as part of the official SIGGRAPH 2013 program later that month.  By November 2013 when the open beta period started, Clara.io had 14,000 registered users.  Clara.io claimed to have 26,000 registered users in January 2014, which grew to 85,000 by December 2014. Clara.io was permanently shut down on December 31, 2022, but the site is currently still partially functional to logged-in users.

Features
 Polygonal modeling
 Constructive solid geometry
 Key frame animation
 Skeletal animation
 Hierarchical scene graph
 Texture mapping
 Photorealistic rendering (streaming cloud rendering using V-Ray Cloud)
 Scene publishing via HTML iframe embedding
 FBX, Collada, OBJ, STL and Three.js import/export
 Collaborative real-time editing
 Revision control (versioning & history)
 Scripting, Plugins & REST APIs
 3D model library
Unlisted and Private scenes (paid subscriptions only).

Technology
Clara.io is developed using HTML5, JavaScript, WebGL and Three.js.  Clara.io does not rely on any browser plugins and thus runs on any platform that has a modern standards compliant browser.

Screenshots

See also 
 3D modeling
Sketchfab
SketchUp

References

External links
 

2013 software
3D animation software
3D graphics software
3D publishing
Internet properties established in 2013
Video game development software
Web applications
WebGL